The 1975 Hawaii Open, also known by its sponsored name Island Holidays Pro Classic, was a men's tennis tournament played an outdoor hard courts in Maui, Hawaii, in the United States. It was the second edition of the tournament and was held from 29 September through 5 October 1975. The tournament was part of the Grand Prix tennis circuit and categorized in Group B. First-seeded Jimmy Connors won the singles title.

Finals

Singles
 Jimmy Connors defeated  Sandy Mayer 6–1, 6–0
 It was Connors's 9th singles title of the year and the 41st of his career.

Doubles
 Fred McNair /  Sherwood Stewart defeated  Jeff Borowiak /  Haroon Rahim 3–6, 7–6, 6–3

References

Hawaii Open
Hawaii Open
Hawaii Open
Hawaii Open
Hawaii Open